Anton Shepelew (born 8 November 1989) is a Belarusian professional football player currently playing for Volna Pinsk.

Honours
Dinamo Brest
Belarusian Cup winner: 2016–17

External links

1989 births
Living people
People from Mogilev
Sportspeople from Mogilev Region
Belarusian footballers
Association football defenders
FC Dnepr Mogilev players
FC Rechitsa-2014 players
FC Smorgon players
FC Khimik Svetlogorsk players
FC Dynamo Brest players
FC Smolevichi players
FC Lokomotiv Gomel players
FC Volna Pinsk players